The French constitutional Law of 2 November 1945 was an interim, transitional constitutional law that set a legal basis for government in France under the Provisional Government of the French Republic (GPRF) for one year until a new constitution was approved.

The law was adopted by popular referendum as part of the 1945 French legislative election on 21 October 1945. Results were promulgated on 3 November 1945. It lasted for a year, until the Assembly drafted a new constitution which became the foundation for the new, Fourth Republic in October 1946.

Background

Third Republic 

In the latter part of the nineteenth century and first part of the twentieth, France was a republic that was governed by the constitutional Laws of 1875 that established the Third Republic. It consisted of a Chamber of Deputies and a Senate as the legislative branch of government, and a president to serve as head of state. This republican governmental structure lasted through the first half of 1940, until the German invasion of France in World War II precipitated the downfall of the Third Republic in July 1940.

World War II and Vichy 

During World War II, France was invaded by Nazi Germany in 1940. Defeat was imminent, and France's military situation was dire. 
Paul Reynaud resigned as prime minister, rather than sign an armistice with Germany, and was replaced by Marshal Philippe Pétain, a hero of World War I. Shortly thereafter, Pétain signed the Armistice of 22 June 1940. Under terms of the armistice, France was carved up into two sectors, the north and west under direct German military occupation, and the south and east under the control of the nominally independent but repressive rump state under Marshall Philippe Pétain known as the Vichy regime.

On 10 July 1940 the National Assembly, comprising both the Senate and Chamber of Deputies, met in joint session in the spa town of Vichy and voted by 569 to 80 to grant full and extraordinary powers to Marshal Pétain. By the same vote, they also granted Pétain the power to write a new constitution. By Act No. 2 on the following day, Pétain defined his own powers and abrogated any Third Republic laws that were in conflict with them. By these acts, the National Assembly dissolved itself, the Third Republic was over, and in its place was the Vichy regime, a repressive, German client state under the autocratic control of Marshal Pétain.

Liberation and Provisional Government 

The Allies invaded France in June 1944 and within a year had liberated the country with the support of the Free French Forces which were based in London under General Charles de Gaulle. Looking ahead to victory and the future reconstitution of France as a constitutional republic after the war, de Gaulle formed the Provisional Government of the French Republic (GPRF) on 3 June 1944 in order to help organize the continuing Free French armed opposition to Germany, and to provide some sort of legal structure for governing France during and after the final phase of the war.

Establishment of the Provisional Government marked the official restoration and re-establishment of a provisional French Republic, assuring continuity with the defunct French Third Republic. It succeeded the French Committee of National Liberation (CFLN), which had been the provisional government of France headquartered in the overseas territories and metropolitan parts of the country (Algeria and Corsica) that had been liberated by the Free French. As the provisional wartime government of France in 1944–1945, the main purposes of the GPRF were to handle the aftermath of the occupation of France and continue to wage war against Germany as one of the Allies. Its other chief objective was to prepare the ground for a new constitutional order that resulted in the Fourth Republic. It also made several important reforms and political decisions, such as granting women the right to vote.

By May 1945, France was liberated, Germany was defeated, Vichy leaders were in jail or on the run, and the war in Europe was over. The GPRF was now in charge of the territory of Metropolitan France, and turned to the task of organizing elections which would decide the future path of the country.

Election and referendum 

Legislative elections were organized by the GPRF and set for 21 October 1945 with two goals: to elect a parliament, and to hold a referendum to decide on a constitutional order for the country. The referendum asked voters about whether France should return to the constitution of 1875 (which would have restored the Third Republic), to give the new Assembly unlimited constituent power to draw up a new constitution, or to give limited and temporary constituent power to the Assembly and charge it with drawing up a new constitution in a limited timeframe. The voters, including women for the first time ever in parliamentary elections, chose the third option.

The voters overwhelmingly chose to empower the newly elected Assembly as a constituent assembly tasked with writing a new constitution, and in the meantime to adopt the constitutional law listed on the back of the ballot as the organizing law of the land until a new constitution could be drafted. Because of laws passed earlier by the CFLN and the Provisional Government, this election was the second election in France in which women were able to vote, the first being the municipal elections of 1945.

Scope 

The constitutional law of 1945 remained in effect for a year, until the assembly drafted and passed the new Constitution of 27 October 1946, establishing the Fourth Republic.

See also 

 The Bayeux speeches
 Constitutionalism
 Constitution of France
 Constitutions of France
 Fifth Republic (France)
 French Committee of National Liberation
 French Community
 French Constitutional Council
 French Fourth Republic
 French law
 French Union
 Government of France
 Politics of France

References 
 Notes

 Citations

Works cited

Further reading

External links 

1945 documents
1945 in France
1945 in law
Constitutions of France
French Fourth Republic
Government of France
Legal history of France